Trevor Bernard Jack (born 19 Jul 1960) is an Australian former first-class cricketer. 

Jack was born at Perth, Western Australia in June 1960. He later studied in England at Keble College, Oxford. While studying at Oxford, he played first-class cricket for Oxford University, making two appearances against Lancashire and Gloucestershire in 1988. He scored 57 runs in his two matches, with a high score of 29.

References

External links

1960 births
Living people
Australian expatriate sportspeople in England
Cricketers from Perth, Western Australia
Alumni of Keble College, Oxford
Australian cricketers
Oxford University cricketers